Andriy Yuriyovych Chyruk (born 8 January 2001) is a Ukrainian professional footballer who plays as a centre-forward for Metalist 1925 Kharkiv.

Career

Early years
Born in Rivne, Chyruk began his career at the Veres Rivne academy before jumping around between the Metalist Kharkiv, Dynamo Kyiv and Shakhtar Donetsk academy systems.

Metalist 1925 Kharkiv
In August 2022 he signed a one-year deal with Ukrainian Premier League side Metalist 1925 Kharkiv. On 3 September, he made his debut as a second half-time substitute at home against Vorskla Poltava.

References

External links
 
 

2001 births
Living people
Sportspeople from Rivne
Ukrainian footballers
Ukraine youth international footballers
Association football forwards
FC Shakhtar Donetsk players
FC Metalist 1925 Kharkiv players
Ukrainian Premier League players